Cuito Cuanavale Airport  is an airport serving Cuito Cuanavale in Cuando Cubango Province, Angola.

The Cuito Cuanavale non-directional beacon (Ident: CV) is located on the field.

See also

 List of airports in Angola
 Transport in Angola

References

External links 
OpenStreetMap - Cuito
OurAirports - Cuito

Airports in Angola